Attorney General Cook may refer to:

Daniel Pope Cook (1794–1827), Attorney General of Illinois
Eugene Cook (Georgia judge) (1904–1967), Attorney General of Georgia

See also
General Cook (disambiguation)